Line 4 of the Guangzhou Metro is a south-north line on the system that runs between  and  stations, spanning a total of  with 24 stations (while  not yet in service). The sections of the line from Xinzao to Huangcun, Feishajiao to Nansha Passenger Port is underground, while that Jinzhou to Guanqiao is above ground. Line 4's colour is dark green. Like line 5 and 6, trains runs with linear motor technology.

Opening timeline

Stations

References

04
Railway lines opened in 2005
Linear motor metros